The Ambassador of Finland to Sweden is Finland's foremost diplomatic representative in the Kingdom of Sweden, and in charge of Finland's diplomatic mission in Sweden.

Ambassadors

See also

 Finland-Sweden relations
 Embassy of Finland, Stockholm
 Embassy of Sweden, Helsinki

References

External links
 Official website of the Embassy of Finland to Sweden

Ambassadors of Finland to Sweden
Sweden
Finland